Helmut Heiderich (born 4 February 1949 Lautenhausen, Germany) is a German politician of the Christian Democratic Union (CDU), and a member of Bundestag. He sits on the Committee on Budgets as well as the Subcommittee on Issues of the European Union.

In 1967 Heiderich graduated from high school in Bad Hersfeld. In 1972 he graduated from college with a degree in economics. In 1987, Heiderich became a professor in business computer science at Fulda University of Applied Sciences; in 1991, he took a position at the School of E-technologies and in the District Vocational School in Bad Hersfeld.

From 1986, Heiderich was a deputy of the CDU, and in 1992 he was elected chairman of the CDU Hersfeld/Rotenburg. He was elected a member of the German Bundestag from 1996 to 1998 and again from 2000 until 2005. In 2011, Heiderich rejoined parliament. During the 18th Bundestag, he is a deputy member of the Sport Committee.

Heiderich is a Protestant; he is married and has two daughters.

References

1949 births
Living people
Members of the Bundestag for Hesse
German Protestants
Members of the Bundestag 2013–2017
Members of the Bundestag 2009–2013
Members of the Bundestag 2002–2005
Members of the Bundestag 1998–2002
Members of the Bundestag 1994–1998
Members of the Bundestag for the Christian Democratic Union of Germany